Angelique Widjaja was the defending champion, however she was defeated in the first round by Marta Marrero.

Svetlana Kuznetsova won the title, defeating Conchita Martínez in the final, 3–6, 7–6(7–4), 7–5.

Seeds
The top two seeds who played received a bye into the second round.

Draw

Finals

Top half

Bottom half

Qualifying

Seeds

Qualifiers

Lucky loser

Draw

First qualifier

Second qualifier

Third qualifier

Fourth qualifier

References

 Main Draw (ITF)
 Qualifying Draw (ITF)

Wismilak International - Singles
Commonwealth Bank Tennis Classic
Sport in Indonesia